This is a list of the districts in the London Borough of Newham:

 Beckton
 Canning Town
 Custom House
 Cyprus
 East Ham
 East Village
 Forest Gate
 Little Ilford
 Manor Park
 Maryland
 Mill Meads
 North Woolwich ( or )
 Plaistow
 Plashet
 Silvertown
 Stratford
 Stratford City
 Stratford Marsh
 Stratford New Town
 Temple Mills
 Upton
 Upton Park
 Wallend
 West Ham

Lists of places in London